All in One is a studio album by Bebel Gilberto, released on 29 August 2009 by Verve Records.

Track listing
 "Canção de Amor" (Bebel Gilberto, Masa Shimizu) – 4:26
 "Sun Is Shining" (Gilberto, Bob Marley) – 3:56
 "Bim-Bom" (João Gilberto) – 2:43
 "Nossa Senhora" (Carlinhos Brown, Paulo Levita) – 3:25
 "The Real Thing" (Stevie Wonder) – 4:33
 "Ela (On My Way)" (Brown, Gilberto) – 3:19
 "Far From the Sea" (Robertinho Brant, Emerson Pena) – 3:22
 "All in One" (Gilberto, Cézar Mendes) – 4:24
 "Forever" (Gilberto) - 2:29
 "Secret (Segredo)" (Thomas Bartlett, Gilberto) – 3:44
 "Chica Chica Boom Chic" (Mack Gordon, Harry Warren) – 3:05
 "Port Antonio" (Gilberto, Didi Gutman) - 3:49

Weekly charts

Personnel 

Pedro Baby – acoustic guitar
Thomas Bartlett – piano, bass guitar, fender rhodes, effects
Magrus Borges – drums, caxixi, engineer, shaker
Tom Brenneck – guitar, tambourine, producer, engineer, vibraphone
Carlinhos Brown – synthesizer, acoustic Guitar, percussion, bongos, conga, drums, electric guitar, programming, timbales, triangle, vocals, claves, surdo, producer, agogo, cajon, shaker, sounds, sapo, blocks, loop, timbaus, tamborim, effects, hi hat, afoxe, apito, boca, sementes
Mario C. – programming, producer, mixing
Dahlia Ambach Caplin – A&R
Greg Cohen – acoustic bass, string arrangements
Christina Courtin – violin
Didiê Cunha – engineer, executive producer
Carlos Darci – trombone, cavaquinho, cuica, tamborim
Mike Deller – assistant engineer
Patrick Dillett – engineer, mixing
Emery Dobyns – engineer
Johnny Gandelsman – violin
Wladmir Gasper – engineer
Cochemea Gastelum – flute
Clark Gayton – tuba, bass trombone, tenor trombone
Henrique Gendre – photography
Bebel Gilberto – vocals, producer, vocal arrangement, string arrangements, flute arrangement, whistle
Didi Gutman – synthesizer, bass, guitar, piano, strings, keyboards, programming, producer, loop, effects, moog bass, ambience
Dave Guy – flugelhorn
Christopher Hoffman – cello
Clay Wells Holley – engineer, mixing
Daniel Jobim – piano, vocals, producer, moog bass
Aaron J. Johnson – trombone
Hollis King – creative director
John King – synthesizer, programming, producer, engineer, mixing, synthesizer bass, sounds, effects
Paulo Levita – acoustic guitar
Zé Luis – flute, flute arrangement
Cézar Mendes – acoustic guitar
Vaughan Merrick – digital editing
Guilherme Monteiro – cavaquinho
Davi Moraes – sitar
Nick Movshon – bass
UE Nastasi – mastering
Mark Ronson – producer
Masa Shimizu – acoustic guitar
Homer Steinweiss – drums
Fernando Velez – conga

References

Bebel Gilberto albums
2009 albums
Verve Records albums